Mandarinia is a monotypic butterfly genus in the family Nymphalidae (Satyrinae). Its single species is Mandarinia regalis which has three subspecies.

Subspecies
Mandarinia regalis  regalis (West China, Central China, Burma)
Mandarinia regalis baronesa Fruhstorfer, 1906 (Indo China, Burma, South Yunnan)
Mandarinia regalis obliqua Zhao, 1994 (Sichuan)

A second species, Mandarinia uemurai, Sugiyama, 1993 is described  from Dujiangya
Sichuan, China.

References

"Mandarinia Leech, [1892]" at Markku Savela's Lepidoptera and Some Other Life Forms

Satyrinae
Monotypic butterfly genera
Taxa named by John Henry Leech